Karaçukur may refer to:

 Karaçukur, Anamur, village in Mersin Province, Turkey
 Karaçukur, Gazipaşa, village in Antalya Province, Turkey
 Karaçukur, İskilip